Nishime may refer to:

Nishime (surname)
Nishime, Akita, a former town in Yuri District, Akita Prefecture, Japan
Nishime Station, a railway station in Yurihonjō, Akita Prefecture, Japan
Nimono, nishime being a specific form of nimono in Japanese cuisine